The 2005 Italy rugby union tour of Argentina and South Africa was a series of matches played in June_ 2005 in Argentina and Australia by Italy national rugby union team.

Italy obtain his first victory in test-match played in Argentina against the Pumas. It was the only victory of a Northern hemisphere team in a test match during the 2005 mid-year rugby union tests

Results 

Argentina: 15. Bernardo Stortoni, 14. José María Núñez Piossek, 13. Lisandro Arbizu, 12. Felipe Contepomi , 11. Hernán Senillosa, 10. Federico Todeschini, 9. Nicolás Fernández Miranda, 8. Gonzalo Longo (capt), 7. Juan Manuel Leguizamón, 6. Martín Schusterman, 5. Pablo Bouza, 4. Patricio Albacete, 3. Omar Hasan, 2. Mario Ledesma, 1. Marcos Ayerza – Replacements: 17. Pablo Henn, 18. Mariano Sambucetti, 19. Federico Andres Genoud, 19. Federico Andres Genoud, 21. Francisco Leonelli Morey – Unused: 16. Eusebio Guiñazú, 20. Matias Albina, 22. Federico Serra Miras
Italy: 15. Gert Peens, 14. Kaine Robertson, 13. Gonzalo Canale, 12. Andrea Masi, 11. Ludovico Nitoglia, 10. Luciano Orquera, 9. Paul Griffen, 8. Sergio Parisse, 7. Josh Sole, 6. Aaron Persico, 5. Marco Bortolami (capt.), 4. Cristian Bezzi, 3. Carlos Nieto, 2. Andrea Moretti, 1. Andrea Lo Cicero – Replacements: 16. Carlo Festuccia, 17. Martin Castrogiovanni, 18. Antonio Pavanello, 19. Silvio Orlando – Unused: 20. Nicolas Canavosio, 21. Gabriel Pizarro, 22. Antonio Mannato

Australia: 15. Bernardo Stortoni, 14. José María Núñez Piossek, 13. Lisandro Arbizu, 12. Felipe Contepomi, 11. Federico Martín Aramburú, 10. Federico Todeschini, 9. Agustín Pichot (capt), 8. Gonzalo Longo, 7. Juan Manuel Leguizamón , 6. Martín Schusterman, 5. Patricio Albacete , 4. Pablo Bouza, 3. Omar Hasan, 2. Mario Ledesma, 1. Rodrigo Roncero – Replacements: 21. Hernán Senillosa – Unused: 16. Eusebio Guiñazú, 17. Marcos Ayerza, 18. Mariano Sambucetti, 19. Alejandro Broggi, 20. Nicolás Fernández Miranda, 22. Federico Serra Miras
Italy: 15. Gert Peens, 14. Kaine Robertson, 13. Gonzalo Canale, 12. Andrea Masi, 11. Antonio Mannato, 10. Ramiro Pez, 9. Paul Griffen, 8. Sergio Parisse, 7. Mauro Bergamasco, 6. Aaron Persico, 5. Marco Bortolami (capt.) , 4. Santiago Dellapè , 3. Carlos Nieto, 2. Carlo Festuccia, 1. Andrea Lo Cicero – Unused: 16. Andrea Moretti, 17. Martin Castrogiovanni, 18. Cristian Bezzi, 19. David dal Maso

Australia: 15. Mat Rogers, 14. Wendell Sailor, 13. Stirling Mortlock, 12. Matt Giteau, 11. Lote Tuqiri, 10. Stephen Larkham, 9. George Gregan (capt), 8. David Lyons, 7. George Smith, 6. Rocky Elsom , 5. Nathan Sharpe, 4. Mark Chisholm, 3. Al Baxter, 2. Jeremy Paul, 1. Bill Young – Replacements: 16. Stephen Moore, 17. Matt Dunning, 18. Hugh McMeniman, 19. John Roe, 20. Chris Whitaker, 21. Morgan Turinui, 22. Mark Gerrard 
Italy: 15. Gert Peens, 14. Antonio Mannato, 13. Gonzalo Canale, 12. Andrea Masi, 11. Kaine Robertson, 10. Ramiro Pez, 9. Paul Griffen, 8. Sergio Parisse, 7. Mauro Bergamasco, 6. David dal Maso, 5. Marco Bortolami (capt.), 4. Cristian Bezzi, 3. Martin Castrogiovanni, 2. Carlo Festuccia, 1. Andrea Lo Cicero – Replacements: 16. Michele Rizzo, 17. Carlos Nieto, 18. Antonio Pavanello, 19. Silvio Orlando, 20. Pablo Canavosio, 21. Cristian Zanoletti – Unused: 22. Walter Pozzebon

References 

Italy
tour
Italy national rugby union team tours
rugby
tour
Rugby union tours of Argentina
Rugby union tours of Australia